"Shakedown Cruise" is a song written and recorded by Jay Ferguson, from his album Real Life Ain't This Way.

Track listing
U.S. 7" single
A. "Shakedown Cruise" - 3:10
B. "City of Angels" - 3:44

Chart performance
Released as a single in 1979, the song reached No. 31 on the U.S. Billboard Hot 100 and No. 27 on Cash Box.  It was his second and final song to hit the Billboard charts after "Thunder Island" peaked at No. 9. In Canada, "Shakedown Cruise" peaked at No. 48.

References

External links
 Lyrics of this song
 

1979 songs
1979 singles
Jay Ferguson (American musician) songs
Asylum Records singles
Songs written by Jay Ferguson (American musician)